Richard Guy Bowers (5 November 1932 – 11 June 2000) was a New Zealand rugby union player. A first five-eighth, Bowers represented Wellington and Golden Bay-Motueka at a provincial level, and was a member of the New Zealand national side, the All Blacks, from 1953 to 1954. He played 15 matches for the All Blacks including two internationals.

References

1932 births
2000 deaths
People educated at Nelson College
New Zealand rugby union players
New Zealand international rugby union players
Golden Bay-Motueka rugby union players
Wellington rugby union players
Rugby union players from the Northland Region